Mike Kirby is an American baseball coach, currently serving as the head baseball coach at New Mexico State University. Kirby attended college at Cerritos College and California State University, Long Beach, playing on the school college baseball team at both schools. Kirby served as an assistant baseball coach at California State University, Fullerton, Los Angeles City College, the University of Nevada, Las Vegas, the University of Oregon, and the University of Nebraska–Lincoln. Kirby was named head baseball coach at New Mexico State University on June 24, 2019.

Head coaching record

References

External links
 New Mexico State profile
 Nebraska profile

Living people
Cal State Fullerton Titans baseball coaches
Cerritos Falcons baseball players
Long Beach State Dirtbags baseball players
Nebraska Cornhuskers baseball coaches
New Mexico State Aggies baseball coaches
Oregon Ducks baseball coaches
UNLV Rebels baseball coaches
Year of birth missing (living people)
California State University, Fullerton alumni
Sportspeople from Huntington Beach, California
Baseball coaches from California